The Plymouth Explorer was a 1954 concept car coupe. It was designed by Luigi Segre at Carrozzeria Ghia.

References

 Plymouth Explorer & Chrysler concept cars conceptcarz web page
 "Plymouth Sports Coupe Has Matched Luggage" Popular Mechanics, May 1954, p. 88.

Explorer